Gornji Rakani (Cyrillic: Горњи Ракани) is a village in the municipality of Novi Grad, Republika Srpska, Bosnia and Herzegovina.

Notable people
Oste Erceg, Bosnian Serb painter and artist

References

Populated places in Novi Grad, Bosnia and Herzegovina